The Scottish Championship was a professional golf tournament that was held 15–18 October 2020 at Fairmont St Andrews, in Fife, Scotland. The principal sponsor was AXA Asia.

The tournament was intended to be a one-off event and was the final leg of a second four-week "UK swing" on the European Tour during the 2020 season.

Adrián Otaegui won by four shots over Matt Wallace to claim his third European Tour victory.

Winners

References

External links
Coverage on European Tour official site

Former European Tour events
Golf tournaments in Scotland
Sport in Fife